Zhou Yun (born 17 December 1978) is a Chinese actress.

Zhou is noted for her roles as Hua Jie and Shu Man in the film and television series Let the Bullets Fly and Golden Marriage 2 respectively.

Life

Early life
Zhou was born in a merchant family in Wenzhou, Zhejiang, she was raised by her grandmother. At the age of 15, Zhou attended the Miss Wenzhou pageant and won the competition. Zhou graduated from Central Academy of Drama, where she majored in acting.

Acting career
Zhou's first film role was uncredited appearance in the film Love Season (2000).

In 2003, Zhou had a cameo appearance in Warriors of Heaven and Earth - an action film starring Zhao Wei, Jiang Wen and Kiichi Nakai - where she played the role of the male Buddhist monk. She shaved her head for the role. She would later marry its star, Jiang Wen.

In 2007, Zhou appeared in The Sun Also Rises, a Chinese film directed, produced and co-written by Jiang Wen starring Joan Chen, Anthony Wong, Jaycee Chan, and Jiang Wen.

In 2009, Zhou participated as A Chun in Bodyguards and Assassins, which grossed over US$5,837,674 on a budget of only US$23 million.

After playing minor roles in various films and television series, Zhou received her first leading role in a series called Golden Marriage 2,  for which she received nominations at the 6th Huading Awards and won Best Actress Award at the Asia Rainbow TV Awards. That same year, Zhou co-starred with Chow Yun-fat and Jiang Wen in the 2008 film Let the Bullets Fly as Hua Jie. She received positive reviews.

In 2014, two films she headlined Gone with the Bullets and The Assassin.

Personal life
Zhou married Jiang Wen, a noted actor in China, their son was born on September 19, 2006.

Filmography

Film

Television

Awards

References

External links
 

1978 births
Actresses from Wenzhou
Living people
Central Academy of Drama alumni
Chinese film actresses
Chinese television actresses